"D.I.S.C.O." is a song by the French band Ottawan, written by Daniel Vangarde and Jean Kluger and produced by Daniel Vangarde. Ottawan originally recorded it in French.

It was first released in 1979 and reached number two in the UK Singles Chart the following year.

The song's name is an acronym and comes from the lyrics in its chorus, in which a woman is described as "D.I.S.C.O.". In other words, each letter of the word standing for a certain quality, except "O", which simply leads to singing "oh-oh-oh" ("She is D, delirious / She is I, incredible / She is S, superficial / She is C, complicated / She is oh-oh-oh").

Charts and certifications

Weekly charts

Year-end charts

Certifications and sales

N-Trance version

British electronic music group N-Trance released a single based on the original hit with added rap lyrics not found in the original, written by Kevin O'Toole, Dale Longworth, and Ricardo da Force. The cover was released in March 1997 as the first single from their second album, Happy Hour (1997), and reached number 11 on the UK Singles Chart.

Critical reception
Alan Jones from Music Week commented, "Once again Ricardo da Force's new and original raps replace most of the verses, while the rest of the group slot in around him. The song adapts rather less well than Stayin' Alive but will surely give them another hit."

Track listings
UK 12-inch single
A1. "D.I.S.C.O" (extended version)
A2. "D.I.S.C.O" (radio edit)
B1. "D.I.S.C.O" (San Frandisco mix)
B2. "So High"

UK and Australian CD single
"D.I.S.C.O" (radio edit)
"D.I.S.C.O" (San Frandisco mix)
"So High"
"D.I.S.C.O" (extended version)

UK cassette single
"D.I.S.C.O" (radio edit)
"So High"

Credits and personnel
Credits are lifted from the UK CD single liner notes.

Studios
Recorded at the Cheese Factory (Manchester, England)
Mixed at PWL Studios (London, England)

Personnel
Jean Kluger – writing
Daniel Vangarde – writing
Kevin O'Toole – writing, synths
Dale Longworth – writing, programming
Ricardo da Force – writing (as Ricardo Lyte)
Jerome Stokes – vocals
Viveen Wray – vocals
Vinny Burns – guitars
Curds and Whey – production
Nobby – engineering

Charts

Chico Slimani version

In 2006, The X Factor former contestant Chico Slimani released an alternative version as a follow up to his number 1 hit "It's Chico Time". His version of D.I.S.C.O. reached number 24 on the British Singles Chart.

Lyrics
He amended lyrics to say "C.H.I.C.O. on D.I.S.C.O." and amended lyrics to:
D dynamic
I incredible
S supersonic
C Chicolicious (alluding to his own name)
"O oh, oh, oh".

Charts

TYP version

In 2011, the song was sampled by Israeli musical duo TYP (also known as The Young Professionals) for their track "D.I.S.C.O." from their album 9am to 5pm, 5pm to Whenever. The music video features Uriel Yekutiel, an Israeli gay icon.

Charts

See also
List of number-one songs in Norway

References

External links
"D.I.S.C.O." page on Chico Slimani website

Songs about disco
1979 songs
1979 debut singles
1980 singles
1997 singles
2006 singles
Ottawan songs
N-Trance songs
Number-one singles in Norway
Songs written by Daniel Vangarde
Songs written by Jean Kluger
Carrere Records singles
All Around the World Productions singles
Universal Music Group singles